The West Valley is a region of Santa Clara Valley in the San Francisco Bay Area. Making up the western portion of Santa Clara County, the West Valley includes the West San Jose neighborhood of the city of San Jose, along with the cities of Campbell, Cupertino, Los Gatos, Monte Sereno, and Saratoga. The West Valley is home to several notable high-tech Silicon Valley headquarters, such as Apple in Cupertino and Netflix in Los Gatos.

See also
West San Jose neighborhoods:
Santana Row
Cambrian
Fruitdale
Willow Glen
Winchester
Cities of the West Valley
Campbell
Cupertino
Los Gatos
Monte Sereno
Saratoga

See also
East Valley
North Valley
South Valley

Geography of Santa Clara County, California
Neighborhoods in San Jose, California